Jhalak Dikhhla Jaa 6 is the sixth season of the dance reality show, Jhalak Dikhhla Jaa. It premiered on 1 June 2013 on Colors. The season was hosted by Manish Paul and Kapil Sharma. Madhuri Dixit, Karan Johar and Remo D'Souza were the three judges. The finale took place on 14 September 2013 and where Drashti Dhami with Salman Yusuff Khan emerged as the winners while Lauren Gottlieb and Punit Pathak became the runner-up.

Contestants and choreographers

Original contestants
 Drashti Dhami and Salman Yusuff Khan, winners on 14 September 2013
 Lauren Gottlieb and Punit Pathak, second place on 14 September 2013
 Sonali & Sumant and Vivek Chachere, third place on 14 September 2013
 Shaan and Marischa Fernandes, fourth place on 14 September 2013
 Mukti Mohan and Shashank Dogra, eliminated on 7 September 2013
 Sana Saeed and Tushar Kalia, eliminated on 24 August 2013
 Sidharth Shukla and Sonia Jaffer & Mohena Singh(After Sonia's Injury), eliminated on 17 August 2013
 Karanvir Bohra and Sneha Kapoor, eliminated on 10 August 2013
 Karan Patel and Sharmishtha, eliminated on 3 August 2013
 Mantra and Ankita Maity, eliminated on 20 July 2013
 Aarti Chhabria and Cornel Rodrigues, eliminated on 13 July 2013
 Shweta Tiwari and Sushant Pujari/Savio Barnes, eliminated on 7 July 2013
 Ekta Kaul and Tushar Kalia, eliminated on 29 June 2013
 Meghna Malik and Savio Barnes, eliminated on 22 June 2013
 Krishnamachari Srikkanth and Amrita, eliminated on 15 June 2013
 Suresh Menon and Suchitra Sawant, eliminated on 8 June 2013
 Vatsal Sheth and Alisha, Actor (not selected)
 Rochelle Rao and Varun, Model/Miss India winner (not selected)
 Rohit Roy and Suchitra, Actor (not selected)

Score chart

 Due to the health condition and Sonali being hospitalized, the duo Sonali and Sumant were unable to perform in week 10. Hence, no marks were given to them that week.

Red numbers indicates the lowest score.
Green numbers indicates the highest score.
 indicates the couple eliminated that week.
 indicates the returning couple that finished in the bottom three.
 indicates the returning couple that finished in the bottom two.
 indicates the winning couple.
 indicates the runner-up couple.
 indicates the third-place couple.
 indicates the fourth-place couple.

Notes
In Week 5, Shweta's choreographer Sushant sustained an injury during technical rehearsals and was thus unable to perform. Savio, another dancing partner who was seen with Meghna earlier this season, replaced Sushant as Shweta's new choreographer.
In Week 8, Sid
harth's choreographer Sonia was injured during technical rehearsals and was unable to continue the show. Hence, Mohena, another dancing partner who was seen with Karan Wahi in the previous season, replaced Sonia as Sidharth's new choreographer.In Week 12, Shaan's choreographer Marischa hurt herself hence she could not perform on the stage. Therefore, Sneha, who was seen earlier this season with Karanvir Bohra performed with Shaan, which was choreographed by Marischa herself.

Averages 
This table only counts for dances scored on a traditional 30-points scale.

Guests

Themes 
The celebrities and professional partners danced one of these routines for each corresponding week:
 Week 1 : Introduction
 Week 2 : Jhalak On Wheels
 Week 3 : Dance Fusion
 Week 4 : Family
 Week 5 : Out Of The Box (Prop Pe Prop)
 Week 6 : Wild Card Entries & Back-up Dancers
 Week 7 : Filmi Masala 
 Week 8 : Costume Drama (Nautanki)
 Week 9 : International 'Item Songs'
 Week 10 : Brahmastra & Team Challenge 
 Week 11 : Phir Bhi Dil Hai Hindustani & Dance Marathon
 Week 12  : DJ Mix & Indian Cinema
 Week 13 : Teen Ka Tadka & Public's Demand
 Week 14 : Ganesh Acharya Special & International Style on Bollywood Songs
 Week 15 : Semi Finals & Dancing with the Fictitious Crew without their choreographers
 Week 16 : Super Finale

Week 4 was themed 'Family' Special, and each of the participating celebrities dedicated their performances as follow.

 Lauren & Punit- Father
 Sidharth & Sonia- Mother
 Shaan & Marisha- Kids

 Ekta & Tushar- Sisters
 Shweta & Sushant- Working/Single Mothers
 Karanvir & Sneha- Lovers

 Drashti & Salman- Brother and Sister
 Aarti & Cornel- Mother
 Sumanth & Sonali- Friendship

Week 5 was themed 'Out Of The Box (Prop Pe Prop)', and each of the participating celebrities performed with the given props.

 Sumanth & Sonali- Matka (Earthen Pot)
 Drashti & Salman- Chain
 Karanvir & Sneha- Feather

 Shweta & Savio- Skipping Rope
 Lauren & Punit- Umbrella
 Sidharth & Sonia- Scarf

 Shaan & Marisha- Pillow
 Aarti & Cornel- Suitcase

1st Episode of Week 6 themed 'Wild Card' Special selected 4 new contestant to current participating celebrities.

Out of the 7 new Wild Card Entrance the couples which joined the current celebrities in the race of 'Jhalak' were
 Mukti & Altaf
 Sana & Tushar
 Karan & Sharmishtha
 Mantra & Ankita
 Selected Dance
 Rejected Dance

Week 10 themed 'Brahmastra & Team Challenge' had two performances from the participants, where one was a team performance. Team leader was selected from the previous week's highest scorers. Team participants, dancing style and songs were finalized by these leaders.

 Initially Sonali & Sumant, Karan & Sharmishtha were both in Lauren's team, but Sonali being hospitalized, they could not take part in the team act and were not scored and Karan & Sharmishtha being eliminated in the same week, they were too not a part of the team performance.
 The marks gained by the participants were added to their individual marks and next elimination was based on the combined marks with the votes.
Green numbers indicates the highest score.

Week 13 was themed 'Teen Ka Tadka' special episode wherein every contestant will get a new celebrity contestant to dance with. Sana and Tushar who were paired with Mumaith Khan could not perform in the episode since they got eliminated in that week.
 Lauren & Punit- Rithvik Dhanjani
 Drashti & Salman- Sanaya Irani
 Sonali & Sumant- Darsheel Safary
 Shaan & Sneha- Hazel Keech
 Sana & Tushar- Mumaith Khan
 Mukti & Shashank- Ragini Khanna

Dance chart 
 Shweta performed with Savio in Week 5 due to an injury caused to her former choreographer Sushant.
 In Week 7, Mukti performed with Altaf, her former choreographer, but week 8 onwards, she continued the show with Shashank as her new choreographer.
 Week 8 onwards, Sidharth performed with Mohena due to an injury to his former partner Sonia.
 In week 10, as Sonali was hospitalized and had high fever with abdominal pain, Sumant performed a solo act which wasn't scored.
 In the first episode of week 13, Lauren-Punit performed with Rithvik, Drashti-Salman with Sanaya, Sonali-Sumant with Darsheel, Shaan-Sneha with Hazel and Mukti-Shashank with Ragini.

Dance Forms 

 Highest scoring dance
 Lowest scoring dance
 Danced, but not scored

Dance Songs 

 Highest scoring dance
 Lowest scoring dance
 Danced, but not scored

Highest and lowest scoring performances 
The best and worst performances of each team according to the judges' 30-point scale are as follows:

References

External links
 Jhalak Dikhhla Jaa Official website 

Jhalak Dikhhla Jaa seasons
2013 Indian television seasons